This is a list of compositions by Mario Castelnuovo-Tedesco.

Piano
Cielo di Settembre, Op. 1 (1910)
Questo fu il carro della morte, Op. 2 (1913)
Il raggio verde, Op. 9 (1916)
Alghe, Op. 12 (1919)
I Naveganti, Op. 13 (1919)
Cipressi, Op. 17 (1920)
La sirenetta e il pesce turchino. Fiaba marina, Op. 18 (1920), also for two pianos (1935)
Cantico (per una statuetta di San Bernardino di Niccolò dell'Arca), Op. 19 (1920)
Vitalba e Biancospino, Fiaba Silvana, Op. 21 (1921)
Epigrafe (per la tomba di Madonna Ilaria del Carretto, scolpita da Jacopo della Quercia, che è in Lucca), Op. 25 (1922)
Alt Wien. Rapsodia Viennese, Op. 30 (1923), also for two pianos (1923)
Piedigrotta 1924: Rapsodia napoletana, Op. 32 (1924), also for two pianos (1940)
Le Stagioni, Op. 33 (1924)
Le danze del Re David: Rapsodia ebraica su temi tradizionali, Op. 37 (1925)
Tre Corali su melodie ebraiche, Op. 43 (1926)
Tre poemi campestri, Op. 44 (1926)
Piano Sonata, Op. 51 (1928)
Passatempi, Op. 54 (1928)
B-A-BA: Variazioni sopra un tema infantile, Op. 57 (1929)
Crinoline, Op. 59 (1929)
Fantasia e Fuga sul nome di Ildebrando Pizzetti, Op. 63 (1930)
Media difficoltà: Quattro pezzi, Op. 65 (1931)
2 Film Studies, Op. 67 (1931)
Tre preludi alpestri, Op.. 84 (1935)
Onde: 2 studi, Op. 86 (1935)
Stars, 4 sketches, Op. 104 (1940)
Candide: Six Illustrations from the Novel by Voltaire, Op. 123 (1944)
Suite nello stile italiano, Op. 138 (1947)
Evangèlion: The story of Jesus, narrated to the children in 28 little piano pieces, Op. 141 (1949)
Six Canons, Op. 142 (1950)
Six Pieces in Form of Canons, Op. 156 (1952)
El encanto. Three California Sketches, Op. 165 (1953)
From the set of Greeting Cards, Op. 170
Tango for Piano on the Name of André Previn, Op. 170/1 (1953)
Mirages for Piano on the Name of Gieseking, Op. 170/4
Fandango for Piano on the Name of Amparo Iturbi, Op. 170/9 (1954)
Lullaby on the name of Claudia, Op. 170/9a (1954)
Etude on the name of Jacob Gimpel, Op. 170/11 (1955)
"Für Erna" (instead of "für Elise") Albumblatt für Klavier von Mario (instead of "Ludwig van . . ."), Op. 170/12 (1956)
A Canon for Robin, Op. 170/13 (1956)
A Fandango for Escovado, Op. 170/16 (1958)
Ricercare sul nome di Luigi Dallapiccola, Op. 170/17 (1958)
Little March on the name of Scott Harrison, Op. 170/20 (1960)
Slow, with variations on the name of Nicolas Slonimsky, Op. 170/22 (1960)
Leggenda per pianoforte sul nome di Gisella Selden-Goth, Op. 170/26 (1960)
Angelus sul nome di Nino Rota-Rinaldi, Op. 170/27 (1960)
Melodia sul nome di Claudio Sartori, Op. 170/30 (1961)
Prelude and Fugue on the name of Gerhard Albersheim, Op. 170/31 (1962)
Prelude, Aria and Fugue on the name of Hugh Mullins, Op.  170/32 (1962)
Canzonetta on the name of Nick Rossi, Op. 170/35 (1964)
The Stories of Joseph, Op. 178 (1955)
Sonata zoologica, Op. 187 (1960)

Works for piano without Opus
Arie Antiche (1905)
Notturno (1905)
Ninna Nanna (Bérceuse) [aka "Piccola bérceuse"] (1905)
English Suite for harpsichord or piano. Homage to Dr. Thomas Augustine Arne (1710-1778) (1909)
Calma (a Giramonte) (1910)
Primavera fiorentina: Le nozze di Lisa Ricasoli e di Bocaccio Adimari (da un cassone muriale custodito nel Museo dell'Accademia); Scene musicali (1911)
6 Novellette (1913)
Lucertolina (1916) - became third movement of Sonatina zoologica (op. 187)
Mi-La (1931)
Preludio su L'Annunciazione di Andrea Della Robbia, che è alla Verna (1934)
Terrazze (1936)
Nocturne in Hollywood (1941)
Homage to Paderewski (1941)
Toccata (based on a theme by Harold Gelman) (1941)
Prelude (1948) (also as "Preludio e Fanfara: 2 études in 12-tone")
Ninna-Nanna del dopoguerra, sul nome di Guglielmo Sangiorgi (1952)

Transcriptions for piano
"La Pisanella" di Ildebrando Pizzetti: 4 trascrizioni da concerto (1916–17) for piano
Valse, from "Serenade for Strings, op. 48," by Tchaikovsky (1943) for one piano, four hands

Two Pianos
La sirenetta e il pesce turchino. Fiaba marina Op. 18 (1920), arranged for two pianos(1935)
Alt Wien. Rapsodia viennese, Op. 30 (1923) for two pianos
Notturno e tarantella da Piedigrotta 1924: Rapsodia napoletana, Op. 32a (1940) for two pianos
From the set of Greeting Cards, Op. 170
Duo-Pianism:impromptu for two pianos on the names of Hans and Rosaleen Moldenhauer, Op170/19 (1959)
2 Balladen von Schiller. Melodrama für einen Sprecher, zwei Klaviere und Schlagzeug, Op. 193 (1961)
The Importance of Being Earnest. Three Acts after the comedy of Oscar Wilde, Op. 198 (1962), Chamber opera for 8 soloists: 2 soprano, mezzo, contralto, 2 tenor, baritone, bass, two pianos, percussion

Works for two pianos without Opus
Napolitana on the theme of the song "Funiculi, Funicula" (1945) for two pianos

Transcriptions
Valse, from "Serenade for Strings, op. 48," by Tchaikovsky (1943) for two pianos
"Pavane pour une Infanta défunte" by Ravel (1944) for two pianos
"Minuet," from L'Arlesienne Suite by Bizet (1944) for two pianos
"Waltz", from Masquerade Suite by Khachaturian (1950) for two pianos
"Cinderella's Waltz", from "Cinderella" (op. 87) by Prokofiev for two pianos

Voice
Le Roi Loys. Ballata cavalleresca. Poesia medioevale francese, Op. 3 (1914), arranged for voice and orchestra (1930)
Ninna Nanna per l'album di una bimba, Op. 4 (1914), arranged for voice and orchestra (1927)
Fuori i Barbari! Canto patriottico, Op. 5 (1915), arranged for voice and orchestra (1915), arranged for band (1915)
Stelle cadenti. 12 liriche brevi su poesie popolari toscane, Op. 6 (1915-1918)
Coplas. 11 liriche brevi su poesie popolari spagnole, Op. 7 (1915), arranged for voice and orchestra (1967)
Briciole. Tre liriche brevi di Aldo Palazzeschi, Op. 8 (1916)
Tre fioretti di San Francesco, Op. 11 (1920), arranged for voice and orchestra (1919-1920)
Girotondo dei golosi, Op. 14 (1920)
L'Infinito. Poesia di Giacomo Leopardi, Op. 22 (1921)
Sera. Dante, Purgatorio Canto VIII, Op. 23 (1921)
The Passionate Pilgrim (songs from Shakespeare's Tradegies and Comedies). 33 Shakespeare Songs, Op. 24 (1921–25)
Piccino picciò (Ninna-Nanna). Versi di Corrado Pavolini, Op 26 (1922)
Ballata (Messer Angelo Ambrozini, detto in Poliziano), Op. 27 (1923)
La Barba bianca. Un dialogo di Vamba (Luigi Bertelli), Op. 28 (1923)
2 Preghiere per i bimbi d'Italia. Poesie di Vamba (Luigi Bertelli), Op. 29 (1923)
4 Scherzi per musica di Messer Francesco Redi, Op. 35/1 (1924) 
4 Scherzi per musica di Messer Francesco Redi. 2nd Series, Op. 35/2 (1925)
1830: 3 Chansons par Alfred De Musset, mises en musique sur des fragments de Bach, Op. 36 (1925)
Indian Serenade. Poem by Percy Bysshe Shelley, Op. 38 (1925)
Drei Heine-Lieder/Tre poesie di Heine; Op. 40 (1926)
Quattro Sonetti da "La vita nova", Op. 41 (1926)
3 Sonnets from the Portuguese. Elizabeth Barrett Browning, Op. 42 (1926)
Cadix. Chanson par Alfred de Musset (1844), Op. 45 (1926)
Ore Sole. Text by Aldo Palazzeschi, Op. 52 (1928)
Chant Hébraique: Vocalise, Op. 53 (1928)
3 Vocalizzi, nello stile moderno, Op. 55 (1928)
Drei Heine Lieder. IItes Heft, Op. 60/1 (1929)
Drei Heine Lieder (Sternen Lieder). III Heft, Op. 60/2 (1929)
Sei Odi di Orazio, Op. 62 (1930)
Ballade des biens immeubles (extrait des "Nourritures terrestres" ). André Gide, Op. 68 (1931)
2 Sonetti del Petrarca, Op.74/1 (1933)
Petrarcha-Chopin: 3 Madrigali (versi di Francesco Petrarca), Op. 74/2 (1933)
2 Romances Viejos. Poesie medioevali spagnole, Op. 75/1 (1933)
La Ermita di San Simon, Op. 75/2 (1934)
Romances Viejos, II series, Op. 75/3 (1935)
Trois poèmes de la Pléïade, Op. 79 (1934)
Trois Fragments de Marcel Proust (extraits de "Les plaisirs et les jours"), Op. 88 (1936)
I saw in Louisiana. Poem by Walt Whitman, Op. 89/1 (1936)
Leaves of Grass. A Song Cycle for Voice and Piano. Poems by Walt Whitman, Op. 89/2 (1936)
Ocean. Poem by Walt Whitman, Op. 89/3 (1936)
Féeries: 3 poèmes de Paul Valéry, Op. 91a (1936)
Charmes: 3 poèmes de Paul Valéry, Op. 91b (1936)
A Dante Sonnet/Un Sonetto di Dante. Dante Gabriel Rossetti, Op. 101 (1939)
Pansies, 2 poems by D. H. Lawrence, Op. 103 (1939)
Recuerdo. Poem by Edna St. Vincent Millay, Op. 105 (1940)
The Legend of Jonas Bronck. Lyrics by Arthur Guiterman, Op. 106/1 (1940)
New York. Poem by Arthur Guiterman, Op.106/2 (1940) 
Upon His Blindness [published as "When I Consider How My Life is Spent"]. Words by Milton, Op. 109 (1940)
Le Rossignol. Words by Frère Joseph, François Leclerc du Tremblay. English version by R.B. Falk, Op. 117 (1942) 
Ozymandias for voice and piano. Words by P. B. Shelley, Op. 124/1 (1944)
The Daffodils. Words by William Wordsworth, Op. 124/2 (1944)
The Shadow. Poem by Ben Jonson, Op. 124/3 (1944)
Shakespeare Sonnets, Op. 125/1 (1944–45)
Shakespeare Sonnets, Op. 125/4 (1963)
Cinque Poesie Romanesche. Words by Mario dall'Arco, Op. 131 (1946)
Vogelweide: ein Lieder-Cyklus für Bariton und Gitarre (oder Klavier), Op. 186 (1959)
Il Bestiario. Dodici poesie di Arturo Loria, Op. 188 (1960)
Poesia Svedese, Op. 189/1 (1960)
The Divan of Moses Ibn Ezra, Op. 207 (1966)
Works without Opus
3 Chansons Grises: parole di Paul Verlaine (1910) for voice and piano
Cera vergine (1916) for voice and piano
La Battaglia è finita (1916) for voice and piano
Due Liriche dal "Giardiniere" di Tagore (1916) for voice and piano, arranged for voice and orchestra (1917)
Il Libro di Dolcina. Versi di Laura Milani Comparetti (1917) for voice and piano
La Canzone della Tombola. Versi di Ugo Castelnuovo-Tedesco (1920) for voice and piano
Étoile filante. Poème de G. Jean Aubry (1921) for voice and piano
La sera fiesolana; laude per canto e pianoforte. Versi di Gabriele D'Annunzio (1923) for voice and piano
La canzone di Usigliano. Parole di Fernando Liuzzi (1923) for voice and piano
Villa Sola. Versi di Alberto Carocci (1927) for voice and piano
Ballade des amantes célèbres; pour chant et piano. Poème de André Gide (1934) for voice and piano
Chanson à boire (Rabelais) (1936) for voice and piano
Tavern. Words by Edna St. Vincent Millay (1940) for voice and piano
[Sweet] Spring. Words by Thomas Nash (1567-1601) (1941) for voice and piano
Two Byron Songs (1941) for voice and piano
My Love's Like a Red Rose for voice and piano. Words by Robert Burns (1941) for voice and piano
Two Stevenson Songs (1941) for voice and piano
Two Kipling Songs (from "The Jungle Book") (1942) for voice and piano
Le Colombe. Words by Arturo Loria (1946) for voice and piano (later became part of Il Bestiario, op. 188)
De Amico ad Amicam. (Lines from a love letter, c. 1300) (1947) for voice and piano
Ballata dall'Esilio. Text by Guido Cavalcanti (1300) (1956) for voice and guitar
Three Little Songs. Text by Ulric Devaré (1958) for voice and piano
Le Voyage. Text by Joachim du Bellay (1525-1561) (1959) for voice and piano

Transcriptions for voice 
"La Pisanella" di Ildebrando Pizzetti: Spartito completo (1916–17) for voice and piano
Three Sephardic Songs (1949) transcribed and harmonized by Mario Castelnuovo-Tedesco. English and French translations by MCT, for voice and piano (or harp), arranged for voice and orchestra (1960)
Vos Toig Mir (A Yiddish Melody) (1963) harmonized by Mario Castelnuovo-Tedesco, for voice and piano

Violin
Signorine. 2 profili for violin and piano, Op. 10 (1918)
Alghe, Op. 12 (1919), transcribed for violin and piano by G. Maglioni (1930) 
Ritmi, Op. 15 (1920)
Capitan Fracassa, Op. 16 (1920), orchestrated by Manoah Leide
Sea-Murmurs. An adaption of "Arise" from Shakespeare's "Cymbeline", Shakespeare Songs Book VI, no. 2, Op. 24a (1932), arranged for violin and piano by Jascha Heifetz.
Tango. An adaption of "Two Maids Wooing" from Shakespeare's "The Winter's Tale", Shakespeare Songs, Book VIII, no. 3, Op. 24b (1932) arranged for piano and violin by Jascha Heifetz
Due Danze della rapsodia "Alt Wien", from Alt Wien. Rapsodia viennese, Op, 30 (1923), no 1 and 2 transcribed for violin and piano by Mario Corti (1930)
Notturno e tarantella della Rapsodia napoletana, from Piedigrotta 1924, op. 32 (1924) transcribed for violin and piano by Mario Corti(1929)
Notturno Adriatico, Op. 34 (1924)
Chant Hébraique: Vocalise., Op. 53 (1928) transcribed for violin and piano by G. Maglioni (1930)
3 Vocalizzi nello stile moderno, Op. 55 (1928) transcribed for violin and piano by Mario Corti (1930)
Sonata quasi una fantasia, Op. 56 (1929)
The Lark: Poem in the form of a Rondò, Op. 64 (1931)
Ritmo di Tango, Op. 65a (1949), transcription of "Tango" by Jascha Heifetz, from Media Difficoltà
Concerto No. 3 per violino e pianoforte, Op. 102 (1939)
Ballade, Op. 107 (1940)
La Figlia del Reggimento ("The Daughter of the Regiment"). A Fantasy for Violin and Piano on themes by Donizetti, Op. 110 (1941)
Sonata for violin and violoncello, Op. 148 (1950)
From the set of Greeting Cards, Op. 170
Serenatella on the Name of Jascha Heifetz, Op. 170, No. 2 (1954) for violin and piano 
Humoresque on the name of Tossy Spivakovsky, Op. 170, No. 8 (1954) for violin and piano
Intermezzo on the Name of Harvey Siegal, Op. 170, No. 23
Valse bluette on the Name of Erick Friedman, Op. 170, No. 24
Hungarian serenade on the Name of Miklós Rózsa, Op. 170, No. 25
Works without Opus
3 Canti all'aria aperta (1919) for violin and piano
Exotica: A Rhapsody of the South Seas (1934) for violin and piano
Transcriptions
"Figaro," from The Barber of Seville by Rossini (1943) for violin and piano
"Don Giovanni" (Serenade), from Don Giovanni by Mozart (1943) for violin and piano
"Cherubino", two arias from The Marriage of Figaro by Mozart, freely transcribed for violin and piano (1944)
"Susanna" from The Marriage of Figaro by Mozart (1944) for violin and piano
"Rosina" from The Barber of Seville by Rossini (1944) for violin and piano 
"Violetta" from La Traviata by Verdi, a concert transcription for violin and piano (1944)
"Jeux d'Eau," by Ravel, a concert transcription for violin and piano (1945)
"12 Preludes" by Chopin (1946) for violin and piano
"Fantasie Impromptu" by Chopin (1947) for violin and piano
"Intermezzo," op. 117/1-3 by Johannes Brahms (no. 1 - 1947, No. 2, 3 - 1951) for violin and piano

Viola
Sonata for viola and violoncello, Op. 144 (1950)
From the set of Greeting Cards, Op. 170
Suite 508, Op. 170/21 (1960)  for viola and piano.
The Persian Prince on the name of David Blumberg, Op. 170/51 (1967) for viola and harp.

Cello
I Nottambuli. Variazioni Fantastiche for cello and piano, Op. 47 (1927), arranged for cello and orchestra (1960)
Sonata per violoncello e pianoforte, Op. 50 (1928)
Chant Hébraique: Vocalise, Op. 53 (1928), arranged for cello and piano (1930)
Notturno sull'acqua (in riva all'Arno, alla Gonfolina, in una sera di Giugno), Op. 82/1 (1935)
Scherzino, Op. 82/2 (1935)
Toccata, Op. 83 (1935)
Sonatina, Op. 130 (1946) for bassoon (or cello) and piano. 
Sonata for viola and violoncello, Op. 144 (1950)
Sonata for violin and violoncello, Op. 148 (1950)
Sonata for violoncello and harp, Op. 208 (1967)
From the set of Greeting Cards, Op. 170
Valse on the Name of Gregor Piatigorsky, Op. 170/3
Works without Opus
Meditation 'Kol Nidre''' for cello and piano (1941)

Transcriptions for cello"Figaro," from The Barber of Seville by Rossini (1943) for violoncello and piano"Don Giovanni" (Serenade), from Don Giovanni by Mozart (1943) for violoncello and piano"La Vallée des Cloches" from "Miroirs" by Ravel, a concert transcription for cello and piano (1944)"Alborada del Gracioso," from "Miroirs" by Ravel, a concert transcription for cello and piano (1944)

OrganFive Organ Preludes from the "Sacred Service for the Sabbath Eve", Op. 122/1a (1943)Introduction, Aria and Fugue (Toccata for organ on the name of Edward George Power Biggs, Op. 159) (1953)
From the set of Greeting Cards, Op. 170Chorale-prelude on the name of Albert Schweitzer, Op. 170/18a (1959)Fugue on the name of Albert Schweitzer, Op. 170/18b (1959)Prelude on the Name of Frederick Tulan, Op. 170/49 (1967)

Works for organ without OpusFanfare for organ on the twelve-tone row. Published as "Due Preludi per Organo" (1949).Prelude on the twelve-tone row. Published as "Due Preludi per Organo" (1949).Prayers my Grandfather Wrote. Sei preludi per organo sopra un tema di Bruno Senigaglia (1962)

Guitar"Arise" from  Shakespeare Songs, Book VI, no. 2, Op. 24/5 (1965), arranged for voice and guitar"Seals of Love" from Shakespeare Songs, Second Series, Book I, No. 2, Op. 24/6 (1965), arranged for voice and guitarVariazioni attraverso i secoli (Variations à travers les siècles), Op. 71 (1932)La Ermita di San Simon, Op. 75/2 (1934), arranged for voice and guitar (1962)Romances Viejos, II series, No. 2", Op. 75/3 (1935), arranged for voice and guitar (1962)Sonata (Omaggio a Boccherini), Op. 77 (1934)		Capriccio diabolico (Homage to Paganini), Op. 85 (1935)Tarantella, Op. 87a (1936)Aranci in fiore, Op. 87b (1936)Variations plaisantes sur un petit air populaire (J'ai du bon tabac, Op. 95 (1937)Rondò pour guitare seule, Op. 129 (1946)Suite pour guitare seule, Op. 133 (1947)Fantasia pour guitare et piano, Op. 145 (1950)Romancero gitano. Poetry by Federico García Lorca, Op. 152 (1951)
From the set of Greeting Cards, Op. 170Tonadilla sur le nom de Andrès Segovia, Op. 170/5 (1954)Rondel über den Namen Siegfried Behrend, Op. 170/6 (1954)Preludio in forma di habanera sul nome di Bruno Tonazzi, Op. 170/7 (1954)Tanka (Japanese Song) on the name of Isao Takahashi, Op. 170/10 (1955)Ninna Nanna, a Lullaby for Eugene, Op. 170/14 (1957)Canto delle Azzorre sul nome di Enos, Op. 170/15 (1958)Canzone Siciliana sul nome di Mario Gangi, Op. 170/33 (1962)Ballatella on the name of Christopher Parkening, Op. 170/34 (1963)Sarabande on the name of Rey de la Torre, Op. 170/36 (1964)Romanza sul nome di Oscar Ghiglia, Op. 170/37 (1964)Fantasia sul nome di Ronald e Henry Purcell, Op. 170/38 (1966)Canción Cubana on the name of Hector Garcia, Op. 170/39 (1965)Canción Venezuelana sul nome di Alirio Díaz, Op. 170/40 (1966)Canción Argentina sul nome di Ernesto Bitetti, Op. 170/41 (1966)Estudio sul nome di Manuel López Ramos, Op. 170/42 (1966)Aria da chiesa sul nome di Ruggero Chiesa, Op. 170/43 (1967)Brasileria sul nome di Laurindo Almeida, Op. 170/44 (1967)Japanese Print on the Name Jiro Matsuda, Op. 170/46 (1967)Volo d'Angeli sul nome di Angelo Gilardino, Op. 170/47 (1967)Canzone Calabrese sul nome di Ernest Calabria, Op. 170/48 (1967)Tarantella campana sul nome di Eugene di Novi, Op. 170/50 (1967)Tre Preludi mediterranei, Op. 176 (1955)Escarraman: A Suite of Spanish Dances from the XVI Century (after Cervantes), Op. 177 (1955)Passacaglia (Omaggio a Roncalli), Op. 180 (1956)Vogelweide: ein Lieder-Cyklus für Bariton und Gitarre (oder Klavier), Op. 186 (1959)Platero y yo para narrador y guitarra, Op. 190 (1960), text by Juan Ramón Jiménez)Tre preludi al Circeo, Op. 194 (1961)24 caprichos de Goya, Op. 195 (1961)Sonatina, pour flute et guitare, Op. 205 (1965)Eclogues, for flute, English horn and guitar, Op. 206 (1965)The Divan of Moses-Ibn-Ezra (1055-1135): a cycle of songs for voice and guitar, Op. 207 (1966)Appunti, Preludi e studi per chitarra, Op. 210 (1967-1968) [incomplete]
Transcriptions"Minstrels" da Preludes, Libro I by Claude Debussy (1951)"Pavane (pour un Infante défunte)" by Maurice Ravel (1953)Sonata I for Guitar and Harpsichord. Realization of the figured bass of a work by Rudolph Strauber (c1725-1780) (1958) for guitar and harpsichord

Two guitarsSonata canonica, Op. 196 (1961)Les Guitares bien tempérées. 24 preludes et fugues pour 2 guitares, Op. 199 (1962)Concerto in G for two Guitars and Orchestra, op. 201  (1962)
Works without OpusFuga elegiaca, to the memory of Ida Presti (1967) for two guitars

HarpThree Songs from As You Like It, Shakespeare Songs, Book II, Op. 24/4 (1941) arranged for voice, harp (or piano) and stringsConcertino per arpa, quartetto d'archi e 3 clarinetti, Op. 93 (1936–37) for harp, string quartet, 3 clarinets6 Scottish Songs (Poems by Sir Walter Scott), Op. 100 (1939) for soprano, tenor, harp and stringsSongs of the Shulamite (from "The Song of Songs"), Op. 163 (1953) for voice, flute, harp and string quartet
From the set of Greeting Cards, Op. 170Arabesque on the name of Roger, Op. 170/29 (1961) for harpSecond arabesque for harp on the name of Pearl Chertok, Op. 170/45 (1967)The Persian Prince on the name of David Blumberg, Op.170/51 (1967) for viola and harpSonata for Violoncello and Harp, Op. 208 (1967)	The Harp of King David. Rhapsody for harp, Op. 209 (1967)
TranscriptionsThree Sephardic Songs (1949) transcribed and harmonized by MCT. English and French translations by MCT, for voice and harp (or piano), arranged for voice and orchestra (1960)

Double bassChant Hébraique: Vocalise, Op. 53 (1928) transcribed for double bass and piano (1964)

ClarinetSonata per clarinetto e pianoforte, Op. 128 (1945)Pastorale and Rondo, Op. 185 (1958) for clarinet, violin, violoncello and piano

BassoonSonatina, Op. 130 (1946) for bassoon (cello) and piano

OboeConcerto da camera, Op. 146 (1950) for oboe and strings (three horns and timpani, optional), arranged for oboe and piano as "Sonata for Oboe and Piano" by the composer"Aria" from the Concerto da camera, Op. 146a (1964) for oboe, cello and piano, also arranged for oboe, cello and guitar

FluteDivertimento for 2 Flutes, Op. 119 (1943)Sonatina, pour flute et guitare, Op. 205 (1965)Eclogues, for flute, English horn and guitar, Op. 206 (1965)

TrumpetSonata Pomposa, Op. 179/1 (1955) for trumpet and piano (for open trumpet)Sonata Leggera, Op. 179/2 (1955) for trumpet and piano (for muted trumpet)

Chamber1° Trio in g major for violin, cello and piano, Op. 49 (1928)String Quartet No.1 in g minor, Op. 58 (1929)Piano Quintet No. 1in F major for two violins, viola, cello and piano, Op. 69 (1931-2)2° Trio in G major for violin, cello and piano Op 70 (1932)Concertino per arpa, quartetto d'archi e 3 clarinetti, Op. 93 (1936–37)Silent Devotion from the "Sacred Service", Op. 122/1b (1943) for two violins, viola, cello and bassString Quartet No. 2 in F major, Op. 139 (1948)Guitar Quintet, Op. 143 (1950) for guitar and string quartet"Aria" from the Concerto da camera, Op. 146a (1964) for oboe, cello and piano; also arranged for oboe, cello and guitarString Trio in D Minorfor violin, viola and cello, Op. 147 (1950)Piano Quintet No. 2 (Memories of the Tuscan Countryside), Op. 155 (1951)Choral with Variations in F for four horns Op. 162 (1953)Songs of the Shulamite (from "The Song of Songs"), Op. 163 (1953) for voice, flute, harp and string quartet
From the set of Greeting Cards, Op. 170Ein Quartett-Satz for String Quartet on the Name of Walter Arlen, Op. 170/28Pastorale and Rondo, Op. 185 (1958) for clarinet, violin, cello and pianoString Quartet No. 3, "Casa al Dono", Op. 203 (1964) Eclogues for flute, English horn and guitar, op. 206 (1965)
Transcriptions"Contrapunctus IV" from The Art of the Fugue by Bach (1952) for eleven instruments fl, ob, Eng hn, cl, bn, hn, strings

OrchestralCielo di settembre, Op. 1a (1912-1915), arranged for orchestraCipressi, Op. 17a (1921), arranged for orchestraCipressi, Op. 17b (1941), second arrangement for orchestraOuverture per "La Bisbetica domata", Op. 61 (1930)Ouverture per "La Dodicesima notte, Op. 73 (1933)Overture per "Il Mercante di Venezia", Op. 76 (1933)Ouverture per "Giulio Cesare", Op. 78 (1934)Ouverture per "Il Racconto d'inverno, Op. 80 (1934)I Giganti della Montagna; due episodi sinfonici, Op. 94a (1937)Overture to "A Midsummer Night's Dream", Op. 108 (1940)Overture to "King John, Op. 111 (1941)Indian Songs and Dances (based on American Indian themes), Op. 116 (1942)Five Humoresques on Themes of Foster, Op. 121 (1943)Overture to "Antony and Cleopatra", Op. 134 (1947)Overture to "The Tragedy of Coriolanus", Op. 135 (1947)Overture to "Much Ado about Nothing", Op. 164 (1953)Overture to "As You Like It", Op. 166 (1953)Four Dances for "Love's Labour's Lost", Op. 167 (1953)
Works without OpusBas-relief (La reine Nefertiti) (1937) for orchestra [2 fl (picc), 2 ob, Engl hn, 2 cl, 2 bn, 4 hn, 3 tpt, 3 tbn, tuba, perc, harp, celesta, xylo (or piano), harp & strings]
Transcriptions"Nachtstück", op. 23, no. 4 by Robert Schumann (c1913-1916) for orchestra (2fl, 2ob, Engl hn, 2 cl, 4 hn, harp and strings)"Partita in B Minor for Violin Solo" by J. S. Bach (1942) arranged for string orchestra."La Vallée des Cloches," from Miroirs by Ravel (1950) for orchestra

Incidental musicSavonarola. Incidental music for a drama by Rino Alessi, Op. 81 (1935) for solo voices, mixed chorus. and orchestra	I Giganti della Montagna; musiche di scena, per il dramma di Luigi Pirandello, Op. 94 (1937) for orchestraMorning in Iowa. Incidental Music to a Narrative Poem by Robert Nathan, Op. 158 (1953) for narrator, clarinet, accordion, guitar, bass viol and percussion

Concertante
ViolinViolin Concerto No. 1, Op. 31 (1924) "Concerto italiano"Violin Concerto No. 2, Op. 66 (1931) "I Profeti" ('The Prophets') for Jascha HeifetzConcerto No. 3 per violino e pianoforte, Op. 102 (1939) for Jascha Heifetz
PianoConcerto for Piano No. 1 in G major, Op. 46 (1927)Concerto for Piano No. 2 in F major, Op. 92 (1936–7)
CelloConcerto for Violoncello in G minor, Op. 72 (1932–33) for Gregor Piatigorsky
HarpConcertino per arpa, quartetto d'archi e 3 clarinetti, op. 93 (1936–37)Concertino for harp and chamber orchestra, Op. 93a (1938)
OboeConcerto da camera, Op. 146 (1950)
GuitarCapriccio diabolico (Omaggio a Paganini), Op. 85a (1945), arranged for guitar and orchestraGuitar Concerto No. 1 in D major, Op. 99 (1939) for Andrés SegoviaSérénade pour guitare et orchestre de chambre, Op. 118 (1943)Guitar Concerto No. 2 in C major, Op. 160 (1953) "Concerto Sereno"Concerto for Two Guitars, Op. 201 (1962)
Transcriptions"Suite No. 6 for viola pomposa" by J. S. Bach (1943) transcribed for violoncello solo and string orchestra.
"Figaro," from The Barber of Seville by Rossini (1944) for violin and orchestra

OperaLa Mandragola (prologue & 2 acts, after Niccolò Machiavelli), Op. 20, (1920–23), Venice, Fenice, May 1926; revision in 2 acts in German, Wiesbaden, Staatsoper, 1928Bacco in Toscana/Bacchus in Toskana (ditrambo in 1 atto da Francesco Redi), Op. 39 (1925–26)Aucassin et Nicolette. Chant-fable du XIIe siècle, pour une voix, quelques instruments et quelques marionettes. 12th-century chant-fable, Op; 98 (1938)Il mercante di Venezia (Versione ritmica dell'autore): 3 acts, from Shakespeare's original play, Op. 181 (1956), Florence, Comunale, 1962 (It.), Los Angeles, Shrine Auditorium, 1966 (Eng.)All's Well That Ends Well (Gigletta di Narbona): 3 acts after Shakespeare's original play, Op. 182 (1955–58), unperformedSaùl. 3 atti dalla tragedia de Vittorio Alfieri, Op. 191 (1958–60), unperformedThe Importance of Being Ernest. Three Acts after the comedy of Oscar Wilde, Op. 198 (1961–62). Chamber opera for 8 soloists: 2 soprano, mezzo, contralto, 2 tenor, baritone, bass, two pianos, percussion. RAI, 1972; staged: New York, La Guardia, 22 Feb 1975

BalletPesce turchino: balletto per orchestra da La Sirenetta e il pesce turchino, Op. 18a (1937)Bacco in Toscana (after F. Redi), Op. 39, 2 solo vv, chorus, orch, 1925-6, Milan, 1931The Birthday of the Infanta (A Ballet Suite from a tale by Oscar Wilde), Op. 115 (1941–42)The Octoroon Ball, A New Orleans Ballet (1840), Op. 136 (1947–49)

Spoken/NarrationThe Princess and the Pea. A Miniature Overture for orchestra and narrator on a Tale by Anderson. Op. 120 (1943)Morning in Iowa, Op. 158 (1953) for narrator, accordion, banjo, clarinet, double bass, percussionPlatero y yo para narrador y guitarra. Text by Juan Ramón Jiménez, Op. 190 (1960)2 Balladen von Schiller. Melodrama für einen Sprecher, zwei Klaviere und Schlagzeug, Op. 193 (1961)
Works without OpusNoah's Ark, from "Genesis Suite" a collaboration with Shilkret, Toch, Tansman, Milhaud, Stravinsky and Schönberg for narrator and orchestra [2 fl, 2 ob, 3 cl, 2 bn, 4 hn, 2 tpt, 3 tbn, tuba, timp, perc, harp, piano & strings].

ChoralLo the Messiah: Ecco il Messia (Lucrezia Tornabuoni de Medici) from "Savonarola", Op. 81c (1940) [aka "Two Songs of Praise (Due Laudi)", pt. 1] for women's chorus (SSA) and piano, arranged for mixed chorus (SATB) and piano (1943), arranged for men's chorus (TTBB) and piano (1943)Mary, Star of the Sea: Maria, Stella Maris (Girolamo Savonarola) from "Savonarola", Op. 81b (1940) [aka "Two Songs of Praise (Due Laudi)", pt. 2] for women's chorus (SSA), arranged for mixed chorus (SSATTB) and piano (1945)Lecha Dodi (for the synagogue of Amsterdam). Acrostic poem by Schelomo Halevi Alkabetz, Op. 90 (1936) for unaccompanied male chorus (TTBB) and cantorLecha Dodi (for the synagogue of Amsterdam). Acrostic poem by Schelomo Halevi Alkabetz, Op. 90a (1943) for cantor (tenor), mixed chorus (SATB) and organProcessional Song in Praise of Saint Ephesius Goccius, Op. 96 (1937) for mixed chorus (SATB) with soprano solo 6 Scottish Songs (Poems by Sir Walter Scott), Op. 100 (1939) arranged for mixed chorus (SATB) and piano (1943)Keats songs, Op. 113 (1942–51) for mixed chorus (SATB) and piano, #4. "On the Grasshopper and the Cricket" arranged for women's chorus (SSA) and piano (1951) London (Upon Westminster Bridge), Op. 114 (1942) for mixed chorus (SATB) and piano Le Rossignol. Words by Frère Joseph, François Lecler du Tremblay, Op. 117 (1942) arranged for women's voices (SSA) and piano (1942), arranged for unaccompanied mixed chorus (SATB) (1942) Sacred Service (for the Sabbath Eve), Op. 122/1 (1943) for baritone (cantor), mixed chorus (SATB) and organ Addenda to the "Sacred Service", Op. 122/2 (1950) for chorus (SATB) and organShakespeare Sonnets, Op. 125/2 (1945) for mixed chorus (SATB) and piano, #2 (Sonnet Nr. CXXIX) for unaccompanied mixed chorus (SATB) Shakespeare Sonnets, Op. 125/3 (1945) for unaccompanied mixed chorus (SATB) Aubade. Poem by William Davenant (1673), Op. 126a (1945) for mixed chorus (SATB) and piano	Carol for Candlemas Day. Anonymous (1661), Op.126b (1945) for mixed chorus (SATB) and piano To His Son. Poem by Dr. Richard Corbet (1582-1635), Lord Bishop of Norwich, Op. 126c (1945) for mixed chorus (SATB) and piano Venice (on the extinction of the Venetian Republic 1802). Text by William Wordsworth and Mario Castelnuovo-Tedesco, Op. 132 (1946) for unaccompanied male chorus (TTBB)Naomi and Ruth: A Small Cantata for Women's Voices, from the Book of Ruth, Op. 137 (1947) for women's voices (SMzA) and piano or organThe Book of Ruth. A Biblical Oratorio for soloists, mixed chorus and orchestra, Op. 140 (1949) [based on Naomi and Ruth, opus 137] for solo voices [2 sopranos, mezzo, 2 tenors, 2 baritones, bass], mixed chorus and orchestra [3 fl(picc), 2 ob, 3 cl (b cl), 2 bn, 4 hn, 3 tpt, 3 tbn, timp, perc, piano (celesta), harp & strings]Songs and Processionals for a Jewish Wedding, Op. 150 (1950), no. 1 and 2 for mixed chorus (SATB) and piano, or organThe Book of Jonah. A Biblical Oratorio for male chorus and orchestra, Op. 151 (1951) for tenor, baritone, men's chorus (TTBB), narrator, orchestra [ 2 alto sax, 2 ten sax (2 cl), baritone sax (b cl), 3 tpt, 3 tbn, timp, perc, 2 piano, 2 cello, 2 bass]Romancero gitano. Poetry by Federico García Lorca, Op. 152 (1951) for mixed chorus (SATB) and guitar Four Christina Rossetti Settings, Op. 153 (1951) for women's chorus (SSA) and piano Three Shelley Songs Op. 154 (1951), for women's chorus (SSA) and pianoSix Keats settings, Op. 157 (1952). 1-3 for unaccompanied mixed chorus (SATB), 4-6 for men's unaccompanied men's chorus (TTBB)The Queen of Sheba: A Small Cantata, Op. 161 (1953) for women's chorus, soprano and pianoThe Book of Proverbs. Six choral settings, Op. 168 (1953) for unaccompanied men's chorus (TTBB)Lament of David for the Death of Jonathan, Op. 169 (1953), for double mixed chorus a cappella and tenor soloSongs of the Oceanides: from Aeschylus' "Prometheus Bound", Op. 171 (1954) for women's chorus (SSA), two flutes, harp, also arranged for women's chorus (SSA) and pianoThe Song of Songs. A Rustic Wedding Idyll, Op. 172 (1955) for soprano, tenor, baritone, mixed chorus (SATB), dancers, and orchestra [fl, 2 ob, 2 cl, bn, tpt, 2 hn, perc, timp, harp & strings]Three Shelley Songs, Op. 173 (1955) for women's voices (SSA) and piano	Two Motets: from the Gospel according to St. John, Op. 174 (1955) for unaccompanied mixed chorus (SATB)Six carols on early English poems, Op. 175 (1955) for unaccompanied mixed chorus (SATB)	The Fiery Furnace. A Small Cantata from The Book of Daniel, Op. 183 (1958), chamber cantata for baritone (narrator), children's chorus, piano (organ), and percussionEndymion. Text by John Keats, Op. 184 (1958) for unaccompanied mixed chorus (SAATTBB)Lauda in honore Sanctae Birgittae (Nicolaus Hermansson, 1326-1391), Op. 189/2 (1960) for unaccompanied women's chorus Memorial Service for the Departed, Op. 192 (1960) for cantor (tenor or baritone), mixed chorus (SATB) and organ	Les Amours de Ronsard. 12 chansons à 4 voix mixtes. Pierre de Ronsard (1524-1585), Op. 197 (1961) for unaccompanied mixed chorus (SATB)The Book of Esther. A Biblical Oratorio, Op. 200 (1962) for soprano, tenor, baritone and bass soloists. narrator, mixed chorus (SATB) and orchestra [3 fl (picc), 2 ob, Engl. hn, 3 cl (b cl), 2 bn (c bn), 4 hn, 3 tpt, 3 tbn, tuba, perc, xylo, 2 harps, strings]The Seventh Day. Motet for Mixed Choir from "The Confessions of St. Augustine, Op. 202 (1963) for unaccompanied mixed chorus (SATB)	The Book of Tobit. Tobias and the Angel. A Scenic Oratorio in Three Parts, Op. 204 (1964-65) for soprano, 2 contralto, tenor, baritone, 2 bass, chorus, narrator, mime, dancers and orchestra [ 2 fl, ob, 2 cl, bn, hn, 2 tpt, 2 tbn, timp, perc, harp, piano & strings]
Works without OpusA Galatea. Due Madrigali dalle Bucolichi di Virgilio (1914) for four voices. Un Madrigale di Michelangelo (1916) for mixed chorus and orchestra (never orchestrated) 2 Canti greci per coro a 4 voci. Poesie popolari tradotte da Niccolò Tommaseo (1917) for unaccompanied mixed chorus (SATB)A Lullaby (on Foster's themes) (1942) for soprano, baritone, mixed chorus (SATB) and orchestra [2 fl, 2 ob, 2 cl, 2 bn, 2 hn, 2 tpt, perc, timp, harp, celesta & strings].		Jubilee Songs (1942) for unaccompanied mixed chorus (SATB)Liberty, Mother of Exiles. Words by Emma Lazarus (1944) for mixed chorus (SATB) and piano	Kol nidrei (1944) for cello, organ, cantor and mixed chorus (SATB)		The Owl. Words by Alfred Lord Tennyson (1945) for mixed voices (SABass) Naaritz'cho (second k'dushah) (1952) for cantor (baritone), mixed chorus (SATB) and organ Cherry-ripe, words by Thomas Campion (1567-1619) (1955) for unaccompanied mixed chorusEpilogue. Sonnet CV from "The Merchant of Venice" (1956) for mixed chorus (SATB) and piano	Lemons. Text by Lawrence Durrell (1960) for women's voices (SSA) and piano		Children's Song, from "The Children of Dom Sierot." Text by Ulric de Vaere (1967) for unaccompanied women's chorus (SSA)

Film music

Credited contributions

 The Return of the Vampire (1943)
 The Black Parachute (1944)
 She's a Soldier Too (1944)
 And Then There Were None (1945)
 Time Out of Mind (1947)
 The Loves of Carmen (1948)
 Rogues of Sherwood Forest (1950)
 The Brave Bulls (1951)
 Mask of the Avenger (1951)
 The Brigand (1952)
 The Long Wait (1954)

Uncredited contributions as "composer of original music" (selected)

 The Stars Look Down (1940) (US version)
 Dr. Jekyll and Mr. Hyde (1941)
 The Affairs of Martha (1942)
 Harrigan's Kid (1943)
 In Our Time (1944)
 Main Street After Dark (1945)
 A Letter for Evie (1946)
 Desire Me (1947)

Uncredited contributions as "composer of stock music" (selected)

 Seven Sweethearts (1942)
 Cry of the Werewolf (1944)
 Manhunt of Mystery Island (1945)
 Just Before Dawn (1946)
 Bulldog Drummond at Bay (1947)
 Alias a Gentleman (1948)
 The Stratton Story (1949)
 Brave Warrior (1952)
 Man in the Dark (1953)
 Charge of the Lancers (1954)
 Creature with the Atom Brain (1955)
 The Werewolf (1956)
 Zombies of Mora Tau (1957)
 Stop! Look! and Laugh! (1960)
 The Love Machine (1971)

References

 Except where noted, all information is from the 2005 James Westby work Catalogo delle opere: composizioni, bibliografia, filmografia'' (Fiesole: Cadmo).

External links
 
The Mario Castelnuovo-Tedesco Papers Collection in the Library of Congress containing a complete list of works and writings

 
Castelnuovo-Tedesco, Mario